The women's 10,000 metres at the 2015 World Championships in Athletics was held at the Beijing National Stadium on 24 August.

Summary
The reigning champion from 2013 Tirunesh Dibaba was absent from the competition, having decided to take a career break to start a family.

Coming into the bell, the lead pack, led by Molly Huddle had dwindled to eight, with Belaynesh Oljira and Susan Kuijken trying to hold on.  The field adjusted for the final kick through the turn, Gelete Burka the first to pounce as soon as they reached the back stretch.  Betsy Saina fell off the back but the rest stayed in close order drill.  It took Vivian Cheruiyot another 50 metres to get pas Huddle then she quickly moved to Burka's shoulder, literally bumping shoulders a couple of times as they entered the turn.  Cheruiyot moved past Burka who then followed Cheruiyot through the turn repositioning herself for a final kick coming off the turn.  Burka made her move, with 100 meters to go Cheruiyot looked directly into Burka's eyes and the battle was on.  For the next 50 meters they raced with Cheruiyot always maintaining the edge.  Then it was clear Burka would not get there and the gap opened as Burka struggled.  Huddle continued chasing, losing ground to the leaders.  Behind her Emily Infeld was sprinting and moved past a celebrating Huddle just one meter before the finish line.	

The top 9 runners were from just three countries.  Had this been scored by cross country rules, it would be USA 13 (1:35:13.30), Kenya 14 (1:35:17.08), Ethiopia 18 (1:35:24.51).  Vivian Cheruiyot returns to top the podium after winning in 2011 and not attempting to defend the title in 2013.

Records
Prior to the competition, the records were as follows:

Qualification standards

Schedule

Results
The race was started at 20:35.

References

10,000
10,000 metres at the World Athletics Championships
2015 in women's athletics